"Barbados" is a song by Australian band Models. It was the second single from their 1985 album Out of Mind, Out of Sight. The song was released in March 1985, and reached #2 on the Australian music charts.

The song is about Models bassist James Freud's alcoholism. The title of the first of Freud's autobiographical books I Am the Voice Left From Drinking is from lyrics in the song.

Music video

In the promotional video, James Freud is seen in a bar behaving all drunk with his bandmates and is, in some black and white scenes, shown driving an army jeep while pointing a gun at his head. He commits suicide at the end of the video. In November 2010, James Freud actually committed suicide, but it has not been disclosed how he died. The song and general mood of the video matched James' own personal demons.

Charts

Weekly charts

Year-end charts

References

External links
 "Barbados" at Allmusic.com

1985 singles
Models (band) songs
1985 songs
Mushroom Records singles
Song recordings produced by Nick Launay
Song recordings produced by Mark Opitz